Maria Aleksandrovna Sukhareva is a Russian chess player who earned the correspondence chess titles of Lady International Master (LIM) in 2013 and Lady Grandmaster (LGM) in 2014. She is known for being a contender for the ninth Ladies World Correspondence Chess Championship.

References

External links 
 

Living people
Year of birth missing (living people)
Russian female chess players